Sin Dong-ui (born 28 March 1941) is a South Korean wrestler. He competed in the men's Greco-Roman welterweight at the 1964 Summer Olympics.

References

1941 births
Living people
South Korean male sport wrestlers
Olympic wrestlers of South Korea
Wrestlers at the 1964 Summer Olympics
Place of birth missing (living people)
20th-century South Korean people